The Samsung Galaxy R (Royal) 
(GT-I9103) is an Android smartphone that was announced by Samsung on August 10, 2011 as a variant to the Samsung Galaxy S II.

Launch
The Galaxy R was launched in September 2011 in Taiwan.

Issues
The phone has an issue wherein the phone will not be able to boot, even after a reset.

Hardware

Processor 
Nvidia's Tegra 2 System on a chip (SoC) uses Nvidia's own GeForce ultra-low power (ULP) for its GPU.

Nvidia's Tegra 2 supports the Tegra Zone application and service which is intended to give Android users an enhanced gaming experience by allowing users to download games that have been well optimized for Tegra 2 powered devices. This has been marketed as "console-quality gaming" by Nvidia. Tegra 2 also features support for hardware acceleration for Flash and Javascript within websites, and is one of the first SoCs to be natively supported by Android 3.0 "Honeycomb".

Memory 
The Galaxy R features 1 GB of dedicated RAM and 8 GB of internal mass storage. Within the battery compartment there is an external microSD card slot.

Display 
The Samsung Galaxy R uses a  WVGA Super CLEAR LCD (SC-LCD) capacitive touchscreen. It has a 4.2" 16 million colours screen, without using the Pentile matrix.

Camera 
On the back of the device is a 5-megapixel camera with single LED flash that can record videos in high-definition 720p. There is also a fixed-focus front-facing 1.3-megapixel camera for video calling, taking photos as well as general video recording. The video recording has been criticized for the lack of focus.

Connectivity 
GPRS:	Class 33,
EDGE:	Class 33,
HSDPA: 21 Mbit/s; HSUPA, 5.76 Mbit/s,
WLAN:	Wi-Fi 802.11 b/g/n, Wi-Fi Direct, Wi-Fi hotspot, DLNA,
Bluetooth:	Yes, v3.0 with A2DP, EDR,
USB:	Yes, microUSB v2.0

Software

Android 2.3 and 4.0
The Galaxy R ships with Android 2.3.4 "Gingerbread" installed.
An Android 4.0 "Ice Cream Sandwich" update for the Galaxy R was released in August 2012.

After-market development
Android Jelly Bean 4.1, 4.2 and 4.3
Official CyanogenMod CM 10.1 (Android 4.2) and PAC man ROM (Android 4.2) firmware releases are available for Galaxy R.

Unofficial CM 10 (Android 4.1) and CM 10.2 (Android 4.3) is available for download at xda-developers.com. Many other unofficial custom ROMs: Paranoid Android, AOSP, MIUI, JellyBAM, Carbon ROM, Vanilla Rootbox, JellyBeer, Avatar, Resurrection Remix, LiquidSmooth, to name a few, are also available for download.

Android KitKat 4.4
Official OmniROM 4.4 was released for the Samsung Galaxy R and is available for download in the OmniROM website.

Unofficial builds of CyanogenMod CM 11 and CarbonRom 4.4 are also available for download.

User interface
The phone employs the latest proprietary Samsung TouchWiz 4.0 user interface.

Bundled applications
Four new Samsung 'Hub' applications were revealed at the 2011 Mobile World Congress for the Galaxy S II and the Galaxy R includes the same:
Social Hub Which integrates popular social networking services like Facebook and Twitter into one place rather than in separate applications.
Readers Hub This hub provides the ability to access, read and download online newspapers, ebooks and magazines from a worldwide selection.
Music Hub An application store for downloading and purchasing music tracks on the device. Samsung has teamed up with 7digital to offer this service.
Game Hub An application store for downloading and purchasing games. Samsung has teamed up with partners including Gameloft to offer this service.
Other applications More applications include Kies 2.0, Kies Air, AllShare (for DLNA), Voice Recognition, Google Voice Translation, Google Maps with Latitude, Places, Navigation (beta) and Lost Phone Management, Adobe Flash 10.2, Polaris Office application and 'QuickType' by SWYPE.

Media support
The Galaxy R supports various audio formats including MP3, OGG, AAC, AAC+, eAAC+, AMR-NB, AMR-WB, WMA, WAV, MID, AC3, IMY, FLAC, XMF audio formats and video formats support for MPEG4, H.264, H.263, WMV, DivX, Xvid, VC-1. Recording & Playback in up to 720p HD video files.
Unlike the Exynos 4210 found in the Galaxy S II, the Tegra 2 has been found to not support 'high profile' encoded h.264 video.
A recent kernel for ICS (developed by a xda developer) also enabled the mobile to support HDMI output support via micro USB to MHL cable..

See also
Other phones with Tegra 2 SoC:
 LG Optimus 2X
 Motorola Atrix
 Motorola Photon
 Droid X2

References

External links
Samsung Galaxy R officially announced for Europe and Asia, nobody surprised -- Engadget

Android (operating system) devices
Samsung smartphones
Galaxy R
Galaxy R
Mobile phones introduced in 2011
Mobile phones with user-replaceable battery